Charles C. Jenkins II (born December 14, 1975) is an American gospel musician in. He started his music career, in 2012, with the release of The Best of Both Worlds by Inspired People and EMI Gospel. This would be his Billboard magazine breakthrough release. His second album, Any Given Sunday, was released by Inspired People and Motown Gospel in 2015. The album again placed on the Billboard magazine charts.

Early life
Jenkins was born on December 14, 1975, in Saint Petersburg, FL as Charles Jenkins II. He is a graduate of both Moody Bible Institute and Trinity Evangelical Divinity School. After college, he became the pastor of Fellowship Missionary Baptist Church of Chicago, where Clay Evans was the founder.

Music career
His music career got started in April 2012, with the release of the single “Awesome” In was then followed by the album The Best of Both Worlds by Inspired People and EMI Gospel on June 12, 2012. This album was his breakthrough release upon the Billboard magazine charts at No. 41 on The Billboard 200 and at No. 1 on the Gospel Albums chart. The album was rated four stars out of five by AllMusic, and an eight out of ten from Cross Rhythms. His subsequent album, Any Given Sunday, was released on March 17, 2015. The album charted on The Billboard 200 at No. 90, and No. 1 on the Gospel Albums chart.

Personal life
Jenkins is married to Dr. Tara Rawls Jenkins, and together they have three children, Princess, Paris, and Charles III. He served as Senior Pastor of Fellowship Missionary Baptist Church (Fellowship Chicago) or (The Ship) from 2000 to 2019 He serves as a Ministry Partner at Vanderbloemen Search Group.

Discography

References

External links
 Official website

1975 births
Living people
African-American songwriters
African-American Christians
Musicians from Chicago
Songwriters from Illinois
21st-century African-American people
20th-century African-American people